Young is a city in the centre of the  Río Negro Department of Uruguay.

Geography

History
On 17 August 1920, the group of houses known as "Estación de Young" was declared a "Pueblo" (village) by the Act of Ley Nº 7.256. Its status was elevated to "Villa" (town) on 14 August 1958 by the Act of Ley Nº 12.515 and then, on 15 October 1963, to "Ciudad" (city) by the Act of Ley Nº 13.167.

Population
In 2011, Young had a population of 16,756.
 
Source: Instituto Nacional de Estadística de Uruguay

Places of worship
 Sacred Heart of Jesus Parish Church (Roman Catholic)

References

External links
 YoungHoy: Local magazine featuring cultural content 
 YoungCiudad.com city information portal: photos and news 
INE map of Young

Populated places in the Río Negro Department